Callan Rennie Elliot (born 7 July 1999) is a New Zealand professional footballer who plays as a right back for Wellington Phoenix.

Club career
Born in Scotland and emigrating to New Zealand as a young child, Elliot was educated at Nelson College and Rathkeale College. He began his career with hometown club Tasman United under the mentorship of teammate Paul Ifill, making his senior debut as a substitute against New Zealand Football Championship leaders Auckland City on 15 January 2017. Elliot became a regular starter in the 2017–18 season, where his appearances caught the attention of A-League side Wellington Phoenix.

Wellington Phoenix
Elliot signed a professional contract with Wellington Phoenix at the beginning of the following season, and made his debut as a substitute in an 8–2 win over Central Coast Mariners on 10 March 2019.

Xanthi
In September 2020, Elliot signed a three-year deal with Greek club Xanthi, coached by Australian Tony Popovic.

Career statistics

Notes

References

External links
 

Living people
1999 births
Association football midfielders
Wellington Phoenix FC players
Xanthi F.C. players
A-League Men players
New Zealand Football Championship players
New Zealand association footballers
Tasman United players
Footballers at the 2020 Summer Olympics
Olympic association footballers of New Zealand
People educated at Nelson College
People educated at Rathkeale College